Pierre Neuville (born 2 January 1943) is a professional poker player from Belgium, known as the Serial PokerStars Qualifier, most notably for his record 23 consecutive EPT Main Event qualifications. Neuville is the oldest PokerStars Team Pro and one of the November Nine in the 2015 World Series of Poker finishing 7th.

Early life
Neuville was born in 1943 in Montigny-le-Tilleul, Belgium. He discovered poker in 1957 and played throughout his 6 years at Universite Libre de Bruxelles, which he attended in 1963-1969.

In 1969 he designed a board game, called Eddy Merckx, after the famous cyclist, and started a toy company, which he sold to American toy giant Hasbro in 1982. Neuville stayed on as Vice President with Hasbro for another ten years.

In 1993 Neuville took a new direction. He started a personal consulting service and some of his famous clients over the 15 years until his retirement in 2008 included Belgian table-tennis player Jean-Michel Saive, golf star Gary Player, and Hollywood actor Kevin Costner.

Poker career
His first recorded cash dates back to November 2007 and the  Belgian Poker Championship, where he won €5,022 for his 31st-place finish. In January 2008 Neuville played the Main Event in the European Poker Tour PokerStars Caribbean Adventure, where he finished 18th out of 1,136 entrants and started his bankroll with the $48,000 prize money. Since then he has cashed in 39 EPT events, and has made 15 final tables. In fact, Neuville set an unprecedented record by qualifying for the EPT Main Event 23 consecutive times. This earned him the title of "Online Qualifier of the Year" in 2012 and a new nickname on PokerStars: ‘the Serial PokerStars Qualifier’. He still plays online with his nickname "Zoutechamp" and is presently the oldest PokerStars Team Pro.

In his acceptance speech for the  Lifetime Achievement Award (European Poker Awards, March 2015) Neuville vowed, “The best is still to come!” Indeed, the 72-year-old Belgian  followed this up with his best performance yet in the World Series of Poker Main Event and made the 2015 November Nine, where he started fourth in chips.

Biggest cashes
Pierre Neuville’s biggest cashes include runner-up finishes in WSOP and EPT Main Events:
$385,041 in WSOP 2014 Event #24
$384,245 in EPT Season 6 Vilamoura, 2009
$290,693 in EPT Season 8 Copenhagen, 2012 
As one of the WSOP 2015 November Nine, he was guaranteed at least 9th place prize money of $1,001,020.  Despite entering the Final Table 4th in chips, he exited in 7th Place after being knocked out by Joe McKeehen.  Neuville received $1,203,293 for his efforts.

Poker Rankings
As of 2015 Pierre Neuville has amassed more than $3,300,000 in live poker tournament earnings and ranks 2nd in the Belgian all-time money list.  He holds a world record for qualifying online for EPT Main Events 23 consecutive times.  Neuville also tops the all time Belgium ranking by number of live cashes.

References

External links
Pierre Neuville The Hendon Mob results
Pierre Neuville interview

Belgian poker players
Living people
1943 births